Bidshahr District is located in Evaz County, Fars province, Iran. Bidshahr District has two rural districts: Bid Shahr Rural District and Qalat Rural District.

References

Districts of Iran
Evaz County
Districts of Fars Province